The Journal of Knowledge Management Practice is an interdisciplinary peer-reviewed quarterly academic journal covering knowledge management and its practical applications. It is published online in electronic format only.

See also 
Electronic Journal of Knowledge Management
Journal of Knowledge Management

External links 
 

Knowledge management journals
Publications established in 1999
Quarterly journals
Publications established in 1998
English-language journals